Silver Stream Railway is a heritage railway at Silverstream in the Hutt Valley near Wellington, New Zealand.  It regularly operates preserved New Zealand Railways Department locomotives along a restored section of the Hutt Valley Line (part of the Wairarapa Line) before a deviation was built in 1954.

History 

The beginnings of Silver Stream Railway were in 1967 when the Wellington branch of the New Zealand Railway and Locomotive Society began a collection of locomotives and rolling stock.  Tracklaying on the old formation of the Hutt Valley Line did not begin until 1977.  The collection of locomotives and rolling stock had previously been stored at a site by the Gracefield Branch in Seaview, and this was transferred to the present Silverstream site in 1984.  The official opening of the full  track took place on 15 February 1986.

List of locomotives

Rolling stock 

The railway owns an assortment of rolling stock, some in operational condition while others are awaiting or under restoration.  The railway has a wide selection of rolling stock and some of the items are rather rare. One of the most notable items of rolling stock is a 50' passenger carriage of the Wellington and Manawatu Railway (WMR), No. 48, later NZR A 1126, under restoration by the NZR&LS at the North End Shed.  Although four WMR passenger carriages are known to exist, this is the only one under restoration.  WMR No. 50 (NZR A 1130) is also stored at the railway, unrestored.

List of rolling stock

Operation 

Trains run from 11am till 4pm on the 1st and 3rd Sundays of the month for most of the year except June, July, August and December when the railway is only open on the first Sunday of these months. In addition the railway is open on selected public holiday Mondays and is available for private charters throughout the year. There are several special event days held during the year, where multiple trains are run, and visitors are offered the opportunity to look behind the scenes in the railways workshop and at other locomotives and rolling stock on display.

References

Further reading

External links
Silver Stream Railway's official website.
 

Rail transport in Wellington
Heritage railways in New Zealand
Upper Hutt
Tourist attractions in the Wellington Region
3 ft 6 in gauge railways in New Zealand
1875 establishments in New Zealand